Anime Evolution is the general name for a number of anime conventions held in Metro Vancouver, British Columbia, Canada. It was organized by AE Convention Corp. until 2010 and by the Vancouver Anime Convention Society since 2012. It was traditionally held in August until 2012 before moving to June and then later July. The event was an annual three-day convention, and over time added two single day events, Harumatsuri and Akimatsuri. The summer event, called AE Summer, was shortened to a single day event in 2017. The 2019 Anime Evolution event: Harumatsuri saw a return to a multi-day format and a Burnaby venue.

Despite similar names, Anime Evolution has no connection to Anime Revolution, another Vancouver anime convention.

Programming
Anime Evolution's programming, like many other anime conventions, includes anime screenings, panels, workshops, cosplay events, vendor and artist rooms, and video game groups.

History
Anime Evolution was originally known as Anime Showcase, and was held in 1998 by the SFU ARC club. It was a two-day showing of anime that was supposed to be held annually, with the help of the Vancouver Japanese Animation Society, the University of British Columbia Anime Club, and V-SWAT. In 2001 it was renamed Anime Evolution and in 2003 became a full anime convention. It has grown each year since 1999, and had attendance of over 4,200 people in 2007. In 2008, due to booking issues, it was held at the University of British Columbia (UBC), Vancouver, B.C., rather than its past location at Simon Fraser University (SFU), Burnaby, B.C. In 2010, AE Convention Corp faced a lawsuit enforced by the Canadian Tax Revenue Agency after fraudulent financial statements arose about the convention. Causing the convention to be momentarily defunct. After the lawsuit ended in 2011, Anime Evolution 2011 was cancelled, and future AE Convention Corp sponsored conventions were put on hiatus. Anime Evolution returned in 2012 under the same team but was renamed as the Vancouver Anime Convention Society and ran as a shortened, 2-day version of the convention in November, dubbed Anime Evolution: Akimatsuri.  In 2013, Anime Evolution returned to the 3-day summer event format, celebrating its 10th anniversary. In 2014, Anime Evolution teamed up with Cos & Effect and Vancouver Gaming Expo to create Northwest Fan Fest. In 2015, Anime Evolution split from Northwest Fan Fest to once again function as a stand-alone 3-day convention, in addition to their spring event Harumatsuri (previous JFest), and their fall/winter event Akimatsuri. In 2017, Anime Evolution announced that their summer event would only be a 1-day event. On June 26, 2018, they announced on their Facebook Page that the summer convention would not be occurring that year. Since 2017, Anime Evolution has yet to re-run their main summer event.

Event history

References

External links
 Anime Evolution website

Anime conventions in Canada
Simon Fraser University
Annual events in Canada
Recurring events established in 1998
1998 establishments in British Columbia